The 1922 Chico State Wildcats football team represented Chico State Teachers College—now known as California State University, Chico—as a member of the California Coast Conference (CCC) during the 1922 college football season. Led by George Sperry in his second and final season as head coach, Chico State compiled an overall record of 5–3 with a mark of 2–1 in conference play. The team outscored its opponents 115 to 86 for the season and had four shutout victories. The Wildcats played home games at College Field in Chico, California.

Sperry finished his tenure at Chico State with an overall record of 9–5–1, for a .633 winning percentage.

Schedule

Notes

References

Chico State
Chico State Wildcats football seasons
Chico State Wildcats football